The 1972–73 season was Real Madrid Club de Fútbol's 70th season in existence and the club's 41st consecutive season in the top flight of Spanish football.

Summary 
The club finished a disappointing fourth in the league five points behind champions Atlético Madrid. Meanwhile, in the Copa del Generalísimo the team was eliminated early in the round of 16 by Sporting Gijón, losing the away game 0–1 and achieving a miserable draw 1–1 at Santiago Bernabéu Stadium.

During February Santiago Bernabeu visited Israel and gave a medal to Moshe Dayan, a gesture which strained relations with Francisco Franco and becoming crucial to deny further government support for a new stadium project.

The squad reached the semi-finals of the European Cup where it was defeated twice by the defending champions and future winners Ajax Amsterdam who would go on to repeat their success in the following season, making it three in a row. President Santiago Bernabéu attended the Final himself expecting to sign Ajax starplayer Johan Cruyff who instead was ultimately signed by archrivals CF Barcelona during the summer transfer window. Real Madrid's offer for the Dutchman was reported to be significantly higher, but he refused to play for the club linked to Franco and his regime.

Squad

Transfers

Competitions

La Liga

Position by round

League table

Matches

Copa del Generalísimo

Round of 16

European Cup

Round of 32

Round of 16

Quarter-finals

Semi-finals

Statistics

Players statistics

References

Notes

External links 
 BDFútbol

Real Madrid CF seasons
Real Madrid